The Bethel School is a historic school in Jefferson County, Florida, with a Monticello postal address. It is located on County Road 149. On October 12, 2001, it was added to the U.S. National Register of Historic Places.

References

External links

 Jefferson County listings at National Register of Historic Places
 Jefferson County listings at Florida's Office of Cultural and Historical Programs

National Register of Historic Places in Jefferson County, Florida
Defunct schools in Florida
Vernacular architecture in Florida